Pemalang-Batang Toll Road or abbreviated to Pematang Toll Road, is a 39.2 kilometer highway that connects Pemalang area with Batang, Central Java, Indonesia. This toll road is part of Trans-Java Expressway which will connect Merak to Banyuwangi of the island of Java. The toll road is fully opened on November 9, 2018 by 7th President of Indonesia Joko Widodo.

Sections
This toll road has two sections:
Section I: (Pemalang - Pekalongan), length 20,05 
Section II: (Pekalongan - Batang), length 16,7 km.

Toll gates
Note: The number on the exits is based on the distance from the western terminus of the Jakarta-Cikampek Toll Road, while the distance numbers are based on the distance from the western terminus of this toll road only

References

Toll roads in Indonesia
Transport in Central Java